James Caldwell (born May 16, 1943, in Macosquin, Coleraine, County Londonderry, Northern Ireland) is a Northern Irish mathematician.

Education
Caldwell was educated at Macosquin Primary School, then Coleraine Academical Institution followed by Queen's University of Belfast; Professor James Caldwell obtained his BSc (1st Class Hons.) degree in applied mathematics and his MSc degree in numerical analysis from Queen's University Belfast in 1964 and 1966, respectively. In 1974 he was awarded his PhD degree in "Magnetostatic Field Calculations", under Dennis Gibson, from Teesside University.

Professor Caldwell was awarded his first higher doctorate (DSc) degree by Queen's University of Belfast in 1985 for his research and scholarly work on "Mathematical Solution of Physical Problems Particularly Involving Magnetostatic Fields" and his second DSc by Teesside University in 2007 in recognition of his research and scholarly work in Mathematical Modelling.

Career
He took up various teaching posts in the UK before moving to Australia as Head of Mathematics at the University of Southern Queensland in Toowoomba. He then returned to England to lecture at Sunderland University and worked in lecturing and research posts at a number of UK universities. In 1990 he joined the City University of Hong Kong Department of Mathematics.

Similar with his academic career, Professor Caldwell worked for a number of large organizations including the role as Head of Modelling with Unilever Research UK. Through his research work, he has published hundreds of journal research papers and conference papers, and more than a dozen textbooks and theses. As a result of scientific publications, he has had extensive experience in editorial work involving mathematics. Furthermore, he has had extensive experience of course development work in mMathematics at a number of universities in the UK and overseas. On retirement he continued at City University of Hong Kong up to 2010 and was adjunct professor in the Department of Mathematics until 2012. More recently he has formed strong links with the Open University of Hong Kong.

Although now retired in Bedfordshire in the UK he still continues with his research in applied mathematics, writing of mathematics textbooks and journal editorial work.

Professor Caldwell, has had extensive experience of mathematical modelling throughout his career in both university teaching and industry and was instructor for a team of three Hong Kong mathematics undergraduate students, who won the first place award, Meritorious, in the 2000 Netease Cup China Undergraduate Mathematical Contest in Modelling (CUMCM).

Caldwell has authored a number of postgraduate textbooks in mathematical modeling and edited a number of annual conference proceedings linked to POLYMODEL (i.e. North East Polytechnics Mathematical Modelling & Computer Simulation Group).

Professor Caldwell has been invited by the Open University of Hong Kong (OUHK) to take on the role of Honorary Professor (Mathematics & Statistics) for the period 2013–2019.

Also Professor Caldwell has been awarded Honorary Doctorate in Professional Achievement by Teesside University in 2014.

References

1943 births
Living people
Mathematicians from Northern Ireland
People from County Londonderry